Lawrence R. Rabiner (born 28 September 1943) is an electrical engineer working in the fields of digital signal processing and speech processing; in particular in digital signal processing for automatic speech recognition.  He has worked on systems for AT&T Corporation for speech recognition.

He holds a joint academic appointment between Rutgers University and the University of California, Santa Barbara.

Education
 B.S. in electrical engineering, Massachusetts Institute of Technology, 1964
 M.S. in electrical engineering, Massachusetts Institute of Technology, 1964
 Ph.D. in electrical engineering, Massachusetts Institute of Technology, 1967

Research interests
 Digital signal processing
 Speech processing
 Multimodal user interfaces
 Multimedia communications
 Shared collaboration systems for tele-collaboration

Life
Rabiner was born in Brooklyn, New York, in 1943.  During his studies at MIT, he participated in the cooperative program at AT&T Bell Laboratories, during which he worked on digital circuit design and binaural hearing. After obtaining his PhD in 1967, he joined AT&T Bell Laboratories' research division in Murray Hill, NJ as a member of technical staff. He was promoted to supervisor in 1972, department head in 1985, director in 1990, and functional vice-president in 1995. He joined the newly created AT&T Labs - Research in 1996 as director of the Speech and Image Processing Services Research Laboratory. He was promoted vice-president of Research in 1998, succeeding Sandy Fraser, where he managed broad programs in communication, computing, and information sciences. He retired from AT&T in 2002 and joined the department of electrical engineering at Rutgers University, with a joint appointment at the University of California, Santa Barbara.

Rabiner pioneered a range of novel algorithms for digital filtering and digital spectrum analysis. The most well known of these algorithms are the Chirp z-Transform method (CZT) of spectral analysis, a range of optimal FIR (finite impulse response) digital filter design methods based on linear programming and Chebyshev approximation methods, and a class of decimation/interpolation methods for digital sampling rate conversion. In the area of speech processing, Rabiner has made contributions to the fields of pitch detection, speech synthesis and speech recognition. Rabiner built one of the first digital speech synthesizers that was able to convert arbitrary text to intelligible speech. In the area of speech recognition, Rabiner was a major contributor to the creation of the statistical method of representing speech that is known as Hidden Markov modeling (HMM). Rabiner was the first to publish the scaling algorithm for the Forward-Backward method of training of HMM recognizers. His research showed how to successfully implement an HMM system based on either discrete or continuous density parameter distributions. His tutorial paper on HMM is highly cited. Rabiner's research resulted in a series of speech recognition systems that went into deployment by AT&T to enable automation of a range of ‘operator services’ that previously had been carried out using live operators. One such system, called the Voice Recognition Call Processing (VRCP) system, automated a small vocabulary recognition system (5 active words) with word spotting and barge-in capability. It resulted in savings of several hundred millions of dollars annually for AT&T.

Awards and recognitions
 Acoustical Society of America Fellow, 1970
 Paper Award of IEEE Group on Audio and Electroacoustics, 1971
 Eta Kappa Nu Outstanding Young Electrical Engineer Award – Honorable Mention, 1972
 ASA Biennial Award, 1974
 IEEE Fellow, 1976
 IEEE ASSP Achievement Award, 1978
 IEEE Emanuel R. Piore Award, 1980 (with Ronald Schafer)
 IEEE ASSP Society Award, 1980
 Election to National Academy of Engineering, 1983
 IEEE Centennial Award, 1984
 AT&T Bell Laboratories Fellow, 1989
 Election to National Academy of Sciences, 1990
 Speech Processing Magazine Award of the IEEE, 1994
 AT&T Patent Award, 1995
 AT&T Fellow Award, 1996
 IEEE Millennium Medal, 1999
 IEEE Jack S. Kilby Signal Processing Medal, 1999

Recent journal articles
 Digital Speech Processing, B. H. Juang, M. M. Sondhi, and L. R. Rabiner, Encyclopedia of Physical Science and Technology, Third Edition, Volume 4, pp. 485–500, 2002.
 Speech and Language Processing for Next-Millennium Communications Services, R. V. Cox, C. A. Kamm, L. R. Rabiner, J. Schroeter, and J. G. Wilpon, Proceedings of the IEEE, Vol. 88, No. 8, pp. 1314–1337, August 2000
 Image and Video Coding-Emerging Standards and Beyond, B. G. Haskell, P. G. Howard, Y. A. LeCun?, A. Puri, J. Ostermann, M.R. Civanlar, L. R. Rabiner, L. Bottou, and P. Haffner, IEEE Transactions on Circuits and Systems for Video Technology, Vol. 8, No. 7, pp. 814–837, November 1998
 On the Applications of Multimedia Processing to Communications, R. V. Cox, B. G. Haskell, Y. LeCun?, B. Shahraray, and L. R. Rabiner, IEEE Proceedings Vol. 86, No. 5, pp. 755–824, May 1998
 The Role of Speech Processing in Human-Computer Intelligent Communication, C. A. Kamm, M. Walker, and L. R. Rabiner, Speech Communication, Vol. 23, pp. 263–278, 1997

References

External links
 Lawrence Rabiner's home page at Rutgers
 Lawrence Rabiner's home page at UCSB

American electrical engineers
1943 births
Living people
Fellow Members of the IEEE
Members of the United States National Academy of Engineering
Members of the United States National Academy of Sciences
MIT School of Engineering alumni
Rutgers University faculty
20th-century American engineers
21st-century American engineers
IEEE Centennial Medal laureates
Scientists at Bell Labs
Speech processing researchers
Fellows of the Acoustical Society of America